Colin Sterling-Wyatt Hodgson (born June 8, 1990) is a Canadian curler originally from Lacombe, Alberta. He is the former lead for Team Mike McEwen and coaches Team Chelsea Carey.

Career
While briefly living in Calgary, Hodgson's junior years saw him skip the Alberta team at the 2011 Canadian Junior Curling Championships, finishing in sixth place with a 6–6 win–loss record. He also won a gold medal at the 2007 Canada Winter Games.

Hodgson later moved to Airdrie, Alberta and played third for Charley Thomas for a year. Following that season, he moved to Winnipeg and joined Reid Carruthers as the lead on his new team in 2014. The team represented Manitoba at the 2015 Tim Hortons Brier, finishing in 10th place. While at the Brier, he won the Ford Hot Shots competition, taking home a 2015 Ford F-150 XLT. The next season the team won the 2016 Humpty's Champions Cup, Hodgson's first Grand Slam title. Later that year they won the 2016 Canada Cup of Curling.

Personal life
Hodgson was a columnist for The Curling News, and also commentates on CurlingZone. He is trained as a chef and attended the Northern Alberta Institute of Technology and Lacombe Composite High School. He owns his own curling apparel business called "Dynasty Curling Ltd". He currently lives in Balmertown, Ontario. He is engaged. He is partially colour blind, and keeps track of curling rocks by memorization. He is Métis.

References

External links

 Colin Hodgson – Curling Canada Stats Archive

1990 births
Living people
People from Lacombe, Alberta
Curlers from Winnipeg
Curlers from Calgary
Curlers from Edmonton
People from Airdrie, Alberta
Canadian male curlers
Continental Cup of Curling participants
Canadian male chefs
Canada Cup (curling) participants
Curlers from Northern Ontario
People from Red Lake, Ontario
Canadian Métis people
Métis sportspeople
Canadian curling coaches